Jack Louis Fox (born 17 September 1985) is a British actor. He is part of the Fox family. He is the fourth son of James Fox and his late wife Mary, his uncles are Robert and Edward Fox. Fox began his career in television starring in the critically acclaimed Fresh Meat (2011). Roles in the Golden Globe-nominated National Geographic series Genius, BBC One’s Privates, Upstart Crow, NBC's Dracula, ITV’s Mr. Selfridge, Lewis, Midsomer Murders, and Crackle’s Snatch followed. He played a leading Role in Sky Atlantic's Riviera (2019), which smashed records for their biggest debut series ever, making it their most downloaded show in history. He continues to play a lead role in Andrew Davies's ITV/Masterpiece (PBS) produced Sanditon (2020-present). Most recently he can be seen in BBC One's hit drama Cheaters (2022).

His film work includes, but is not limited to, the Oscar-nominated BAFTA winning feature Theeb, Johnny English, The Messenger,  Kids in Love,  Blood Moon.

Fox made his West End debut opposite his father, James Fox, in Dear Lupin (UK Tour, West End).

Early life
Fox was born to actor James Fox and Mary Elizabeth Piper on 17 September 1985 in London. He is the younger brother of Thomas, Laurence, Robin, and Lydia Fox, as well as the nephew of producer Robert Fox and actor Edward Fox (father to Emilia and Freddie). He went to preparatory school at the Milbourne Lodge School, and then attended The King's School, Canterbury. Following that, he attended the University of Leeds, studying philosophy and theology, where he gained a 2:1.

Career
Having left Leeds University, in 2009 Fox’s first professional role was playing Perkin Warbeck, in Channel 4’s Tv Mini Series, Henry VIII: Mind of a Tyrant. His next role was to be found in ITV’s Lewis, in which he played the guest lead character of Alfie Wilkinson, opposite Kevin Whatley. In 2011, Fox was cast opposite Edmund Kingsley in Pierre Granier-Deferre’s Beast, in which he turned heads as the frightening and capable Robert. He then went onto star in Aml Ameen’s written and directed Hoorah, a military PTSD thriller. At the end of 2011, Fox was then cast in Channel 4’s critically acclaimed Fresh Meat, created by Jessie Armstrong and Sam Bain, in which he demonstrated his comedic touch, playing Ralph, a manipulative counterweight to Jack Whitehall’s JP, in an arc that spanned two seasons. A leading role in BBC One’s Privates, followed, in which he played the malevolent Private White-Bowne, directed by Brynn Higgins. At the start of 2013, Fox was then cast in NBC’s Dracula, as the expert swordsman Alastair Harvey, before moving onto ITV’s Mr. Selfridge. 

In 2014 he was cast by Naji Abu Nowar in Theeb, the story of a young Bedouin boy as he experiences a greatly hastened coming-of-age, as he embarks on a perilous desert journey to guide a British officer, played by Fox, to his secret destination. The film was a roaring success gaining Naji Abu Nowar the Venice Horizon’s Award, collecting multiple accolades on the way to two BAFTA wins, and an Oscar Nomination. Film Roles in The Messenger, directed by BAFTA winning director David Blair, and Kids in Love opposite Will Poulter and Cara Delevingne followed, before returning to television to work on  the Golden Globe-nominated National Geographic series Genius opposite Geoffrey Rush. Fox was then cast in Ben Elton’s Upstart Crowe opposite David Mitchell, before moving onto Working Title's Jonny English Strikes Again opposite Rowan Atkinson. 

In the summer of 2015 Fox made his West End debut at the Apollo theatre in London. The two-hander named Dear Lupin, adapted by Michael Simkins from author Charlie Mortimer’s smash hit of the same name, was directed by Philip Franks. The play was a huge success gaining four star reviews from The Daily Mail and The Evening Standard.

In 2019 Fox was cast in Sky Atlantic's Riviera (2019), which smashed records for their biggest debut series ever. He played Nico Eltham, a psychopathic megalomaniac, opposite Juliet Stevenson, Will Arnett, and Julia Stiles leading to him being the cover star for Rollacoaster's Autumn/Winter 2020 edition.
He then moved onto Andrew Davies's ITV/Masterpiece (PBS) produced Sanditon (2020-present), in which he played manipulative and narcissistic Edward Denham, opposite Theo James and Rose Williams. in 2021, a return to comedy-drama followed, this time in a new format, eighteen ten-minute episodes, produced by Clerkenwell Films and directed by Elliot Hegarty. Cheaters would see him work with Josh Maguire, Susan Wokoma, and Callie Cooke, in this acclaimed comedy. At the start of 2022, he began production on Óskar Þór Axelsson’s Operation Napoleon, a film based on Arnaldur Indriðason's best selling book of the same name. He stars alongside Iain Glenn, Wotan Wilke Möhring, and Ólafur Darri Ólafsson.

Filmography

References

External links 

http://www.mrjackfox.com
https://luxurylondon.co.uk/culture/entertainment/jack-fox-actor-interview

http://thebwhagency.co.uk/jack-fox

1985 births
Living people
People educated at The King's School, Canterbury
Alumni of the University of Leeds
Robin Fox family
Male actors from London
English male television actors
British male film actors
English male stage actors
21st-century English male actors